Cláudio Filipe Maia Ribeiro (born 29 May 1995 in Vila das Aves)  is a Portuguese footballer who plays for FC Porto B on loan from Vitória Guimarães B, as a forward.

External links
  
 Stats and profile at LPFP
 

1995 births
Living people
Portuguese footballers
Association football forwards
Liga Portugal 2 players
FC Porto B players